The Levi P. Grinnell House is a historic dwelling located in Grinnell, Iowa, United States.  Levi Grinnell came from Vermont to settle in Poweshiek County in the 1850s.  He was a cousin of Josiah Bushnell Grinnell, a political and social activist who founded the town and Grinnell College.  Levi Grinnell owned this property from 1857 to 1863, and had the house built about 1860. After he left here he farmed outside of town.  The 1½-story frame structure is characteristic of vernacular Greek Revival domestic architecture found in the small towns and the rural areas of the upper Midwest.  The house was listed on the National Register of Historic Places in 1979.

References

Houses completed in 1860
Grinnell, Iowa
Houses in Poweshiek County, Iowa
Houses on the National Register of Historic Places in Iowa
National Register of Historic Places in Poweshiek County, Iowa
Greek Revival architecture in Iowa
1860 establishments in Iowa